Robert William Bilger  (22 April 1935 – 2 October 2015) was a South African born Australian engineer.

He studied at Auckland University College in New Zealand before attending Exeter College, University of Oxford on a Rhodes Scholarship. In 1965 he joined the University of Sydney as a senior lecturer in mechanical engineering before becoming a professor in 1976, where he remained until his retirement in 2006.

He was awarded the status of Fellow in the American Physical Society, after being nominated by the Division of Fluid Dynamics in 2002, for "outstanding contributions to knowledge of turbulent reactive flows through insightful experiments, theory and modelling, especially for elucidating the fundamental processes in turbulent combustion and for the development of the conditional moment closure."

References 

Fellows of the American Physical Society
Australian physicists
1935 births
2015 deaths
New Zealand Rhodes Scholars
Alumni of Exeter College, Oxford
University of Auckland alumni
Academic staff of the University of Sydney